Erika Micaela Cabrera (born 18 July 1997) is an Argentine footballer and futsal player who plays as a midfielder for Boca Juniors and the Argentina women's national team.

International career
Cabrera represented Argentina at the 2012 South American U-17 Women's Championship, the 2012 FIFA U-20 Women's World Cup and two South American U-20 Women's Championship editions (2014 and 2015). At senior level, she played the 2014 South American Games, the 2014 Copa América Femenina and the 2015 Pan American Games.

International goals
Scores and results list Argentina's goal tally first

References
Notes

Citations

1997 births
Living people
Women's association football midfielders
Argentine women's footballers
Sportspeople from Buenos Aires Province
People from Lomas de Zamora
Argentina women's international footballers
Footballers at the 2015 Pan American Games
Pan American Games silver medalists for Argentina
Pan American Games medalists in football
Footballers at the 2019 Pan American Games
South American Games gold medalists for Argentina
South American Games medalists in football
Competitors at the 2014 South American Games
Independiente (women) players
UAI Urquiza (women) players
San Lorenzo de Almagro footballers
Santiago Morning (women) footballers
Boca Juniors (women) footballers
Argentine expatriate women's footballers
Argentine expatriate sportspeople in Chile
Expatriate women's footballers in Chile
Argentine women's futsal players
Medalists at the 2019 Pan American Games